Mucinivorans is an anaerobic bacterial genus from the family of Rikenellaceae with one known species (Mucinivorans hirudinis). Mucinivorans hirudinis has been isolated from the digestrive tract of the leech Hirudo verbana.

References

Bacteroidia
Monotypic bacteria genera
Bacteria genera